Mikko Tuomi is a Finnish astronomer from the University of Hertfordshire, most known for his contributions to the discovery of a number of exoplanets, among them the Proxima Centauri b which orbits the closest star to the Sun. Mikko Tuomi was the first to find indications of the existence of Proxima Centauri b in archival observation data. Other exoplanets to whose discovery or study Tuomi has contributed include HD 40307, HD 154857 c, Kapteyn c, Gliese 682 c, HD 154857, Gliese 221, Gliese 581 g and the planetary system orbiting Tau Ceti. He has led the development of new data analysis techniques for distinguishing observations caused by natural activity of the star and those caused by planets orbiting them.

Publications 
Mikko Tuomi has contributed to many cosmologist research articles including:
 "A Super-Earth in the Habitable Zone"
 "Two planets around Kapteyn's star: A cold and a temperate super-Earth orbiting the nearest halo red dwarf"
 "Bayesian search for low-mass planets around nearby M. draws. Estimates for occurrence rate based on global detestability statistics"
 "A dynamically-packed planetary system around GJ667C with three super-Earths in its habitable zone"

Discoveries 
Mikko Tuomi helped discover the Proxima Centauri b planet by observing the gravitational tug of Proxima Centauri's star, Proxima Centauri.

See also 
 Exoplanetology
 List of potentially habitable exoplanets
 Proxima Centauri

References 

Finnish astronomers
Year of birth missing (living people)
Living people